Pike High School is a public high school on the northwest side of Indianapolis, Indiana.

Athletics 
Conference History 

Varsity Sports

 Baseball (boys)
 Basketball (girls and boys)
 Cross country (girls and boys)
 Football (boys)
 Golf (girls and boys)
 Soccer (girls and boys)
 Softball (girls)
 Swimming and diving (girls and boys)
 Tennis (girls and boys)
 Track and field (girls and boys)
 Volleyball (girls)
 Wrestling (boys)

State Championships 

 Boys Basketball (1998,2001,2003)
 Boys Tennis (1969)
 Girls Track and Field (1997,2012,2015)

Notable Alumni
Ivan Rogers (actor) - film actor, director, producer and martial artist
Lori Lindsey - A retired member of the United States women's national soccer team player pool. She played one match in the 2011 FIFA Women's World Cup in Germany and was named an alternate for the 2012 Olympics in London. 
David Teague - Former NBA D-League player for the Fort Wayne Mad Ants. Teague also previously played for several other professional basketball leagues outside of the United States
Jeff Teague - Current NBA All-star point guard for the Milwaukee Bucks
Marquis Teague - Current NBA D-League point guard for the Oklahoma City Blue. Teague formerly played for the Brooklyn Nets of the NBA, as well as the Iowa Energy of the NBA D-League
Courtney Lee - Current NBA shooting guard for the Dallas Mavericks. Lee formerly played for the Orlando Magic, New Jersey Nets, Houston Rockets, Boston Celtics, Memphis Grizzlies, the Charlotte Hornets, and the New York Knicks.
R. J. Hunter - Current NBA D-League shooting guard for the Maine Red Claws. Hunter formerly played for the Boston Celtics of the NBA
Peter Dunn - Financial author, radio host, television personality, and speaker
Mark Battles - rapper, producer and founder of record label Fly America
Carl Broemel - Rock musician and guitar player for the band "My Morning Jacket"
Sasheer Zamata - Comedian and cast member of Saturday Night Live
Eric Holcomb - Governor of Indiana
Lyna Irby - Olympic Sprinter
Mike Walker - member, Canadian Football League Hall of Fame

See also
 List of high schools in Indiana

References

External links

Schools in Indianapolis
Public high schools in Indiana
Educational institutions established in 1892
1892 establishments in Indiana